Kansas Raiders is a 1950 American Western film directed by Ray Enright, and stars Audie Murphy, Brian Donlevy, Marguerite Chapman, and Scott Brady. It is set during the American Civil War and involves Jesse James coming under the influence of William Quantrill.

Plot
Jesse James (Murphy) and his friends—brother Frank (Richard Long), brothers Cole (James Best) and Jim Younger (Dewey Martin), plus Kit Dalton (Tony Curtis) -- arrive in Lawrence, Kansas, and are falsely accused of being members of Quantrill's Raiders. They are about to be lynched but are saved by the intervention of a Union officer.

The men are released and they go on and join Quantrill (Donlevy). Jesse at first admires Quantrill but comes to  question his devotion after seeing atrocities committed by the man and his troops. He also falls for Kate Clarke (Marguerite Chapman).

The raiders take part in the Lawrence Massacre in which Jesse and his men rob their first bank. Most of the raiders abandon Quantrill except for Jesse. Quantrill is blinded then killed in a shoot out with Union troops. Jesse leaves Kate and heads off with his friends to a life of crime.

Cast
 Audie Murphy as Jesse James
 Brian Donlevy as Quantrill
 Marguerite Chapman as Kate Clarke
 Scott Brady as Bill Anderson
 Tony Curtis as Kit Dalton
 Richard Arlen as Union Captain
 Richard Long as Frank James
 James Best as Cole Younger
 John Kellogg as Red Leg leader
 Dewey Martin as James Younger
 George Chandler as Willie
 Charles Delaney as Pell
 Richard Egan as First Lieutenant 
 David Bauer as Tate (as Dave Wolfe)

Home media
Universal Pictures released the film on DVD in 2007 as part of its Classic Western Round-Up, Volume 1 set, a 2-disc set featuring three other films (The Texas Rangers, Canyon Passage, and The Lawless Breed). The exact same set was re-released in 2011, as part of Universal's 4 Movie Marathon DVD series, being repackaged as the "Classic Western Collection". In 2014, the film was bundled in a different Universal set, Classic Westerns, 10 Movie Collection; the only difference in this release is that no subtitles were provided on-screen.

References

External links
 
 
 

American historical films
1950 films
1950s historical films
1950 Western (genre) films
Audie Murphy
1950s English-language films
American Western (genre) films
American Civil War films
Films set in Kansas
Biographical films about Jesse James
Films directed by Ray Enright
Universal Pictures films
1950s American films